The 1987–88 season was Manchester City’s first season in the Football League Second Division, the second division of English football.

League

Final league table

Results summary

Match reports

FA Cup

Match reports

League Cup

Match reports

Full Members' Cup

Match reports

Squad

Manager: Mel Machin

Transfers

In

Out

References

Manchester City F.C. seasons
Manchester City
Articles which contain graphical timelines